Utowana Lake is a lake in the Eckford Chain, Adirondacks, NY. It is connected to Eagle Lake and Blue Mountain Lake to the East and the Marion River/Raquette Lake to the West. It was owned by adventure writer Ned Buntline in 1867 and by William West Durant in 1888 before being purchased by mining magnate Berthold Hochschild in 1904. A significant part of the North shore is still owned by the Hochschild family as part of the Eagle Nest camp; the rest is under conservation easements.

Fishing
Fish species present in Utowana Lake are brook trout, white sucker, sunfish, black bullhead, atlantic salmon, yellow perch, and smallmouth bass. Access via channel from Eagle Lake.

References

Lakes of New York (state)
Lakes of Hamilton County, New York